The 2009–10 Liga de Nuevos Talentos season was split in two tournaments Apertura and Bicentenario. Liga de Nuevos Talentos was the fourth–tier football league of Mexico. The season was played between 13 August 2010 and 22 May 2010.

Teams

Sureste Zone

Bajío Zone 
{{Location map+ |Mexico |width=650|float=right |caption=Location of teams in the 2009–10 LNT Group 2 |places=

Noroeste Zone

Torneo Apertura

Regular season

Sureste Zone

League table

Results

Bajío Zone

League table

Results

Noroeste Zone

League table

Results

Liguilla

Quarter-finals

First leg

Second leg

Semi-finals

First leg

Second leg

Final

First leg

Second leg

Torneo Bicentenario

Regular season

Sureste Zone

League table

Results

Bajío Zone

League table

Results

Noroeste Zone

League table

Results

Liguilla

Quarter-finals

First leg

Second leg

Semi-finals

First leg

Second leg

Final

First leg

Second leg

Relegation Table 

Last updated: 24 April 2010 Source: Liga Premier FMFP = Position; G = Games played; Pts = Points; Pts/G = Ratio of points to games played

Promotion Final
The Promotion Final is a series of matches played by the champions of the tournaments Apertura and Clausura, the game was played to determine the winning team of the promotion to Liga Premier de Ascenso. The first leg was played on 19 May 2010, and the second leg was played on 22 May 2010.

First leg

Second leg

See also 
2009–10 Mexican Primera División season
2009–10 Liga de Ascenso season
2009–10 Liga Premier de Ascenso season

References

External links 
 Official website of Liga Premier
 Magazine page  

 
1